Frying Pan is an unincorporated community in Tyrrell County, North Carolina, United States.

The community was named for a nearby inlet of the Alligator River said to be shaped like a frying pan.

References

Unincorporated communities in Tyrrell County, North Carolina
Unincorporated communities in North Carolina